Oceans of Slumber is an American heavy metal band from Houston, Texas, formed in 2011.

History
Their self-released debut album Aetherial was released in February 2013.

Lead vocalist Cammie Gilbert joined the band in 2014, after previous vocalist Ronnie Gates left. Gilbert became the primary lyrics writer for the group after joining.

In 2015, the band signed with Century Media Records.
In 2016, they toured with Ne Obliviscaris and Enslaved on a 34 date European tour.

In March 2016, they released their second album, Winter, which received positive reviews from The Houston Press and Metal Injection.

On December 17, 2017, they released the lead single "The Decay of Disregard" off of their upcoming album The Banished Heart. The second single was "The Banished Heart". The third single "No Color, No Light" in February 2018, featuring Tom S. Englund from Evergrey. The album was released on March 3, 2018. The album was included on the list of "50 Best albums of 2018 So Far" by Metal Hammer.
The band has been called a "female fronted Opeth" by Noisey.
In 2018, the band toured with Insomnium. In 2019, they joined Swallow the Sun as support for their European tour.

Members

Current members

Dobber Beverly – drums, piano (2011–present)
Cammie Gilbert-Beverly – lead vocals (2014–present)
Semir Ozerkan – bass, backing vocals (2019–present)
Jessie Santos – guitars (2019–present)
Alexander Lucian – guitars, backing vocals (2019–present)

Previous members
Ronnie Gates – lead vocals (2011–2014)
Beau Beasley – keyboards (2015)
Sean Gary – guitars, harsh vocals (2011–2018)
Anthony Contreras – guitars, backing vocals (2011–2018)
Keegan Kelly – bass, backing vocals (2011–2019)
Mat V. Aleman – keyboards (2014–2022)

Timeline

Discography

Studio albums
 Aetherial (2013)
 Winter (2016)
 The Banished Heart (2018)
 Oceans of Slumber (2020)
 Starlight and Ash (2022)

EPs
 Blue (2015)

References

External links
Official website

2011 establishments in Texas
American gothic metal musical groups
American progressive metal musical groups
Century Media Records artists
Female-fronted musical groups
Heavy metal musical groups from Texas
Musical groups from Houston
Musical groups established in 2011
Musical quintets